Achille Longo (March 28, 1900 – May 28, 1954) was an Italian composer and music teacher.

Biography 
Achille (junior), son of Alessandro and Luisa Todisco, was born in Naples on 28 March 1900. He was a pupil first of his father, and then of A. Savasta, at the Naples Conservatory, where he graduated in piano in 1918 and in organ and composition in 1920. He taught harmony and counterpoint at the same conservatory from 1926 to 1930; from 1931 to 1933 he taught harmony and counterpoint at the conservatory in Parma, where, among others, F. Margola was his pupil. In 1934 he returned to the conservatory in Naples, first as a teacher of counterpoint and fugue, and then, from 1941 until his death, of composition. The famous pianist Aldo Ciccolini studied composition with him in Naples.

Achille Longo, along with Beniamino Cesi, Sigismund Thalberg, Alessandro Longo and Vincenzo Vitale, is considered one of the most important Italian piano teacher of the 20th century, and contributed in creating what is considered today as the 'Neapolitan piano school'.

Compositions
The following were used in films, orchestras, and also symphonic music.

Vocal music
Canzonette de Poliziano (1930)
Chansons Enfantines (1952)
Stanze del Poliziano (1930)

Sacred
Messe de Requiem (1933)

Symphonic
Sinfonie (1950)
Burla de Piervano Arotto (1933)
Scenette Pastorale (1924)

References

20th-century Italian composers
1900 births
1954 deaths